Joseph Malin (born 13 July 1988 in Bellshill) is a Scottish football player, who plays as a goalkeeper for Brora Rangers. Malin has previously played for Ross County and Elgin City.

Malin, originally Malinauskas, is of Lithuanian descent, and is also eligible to represent Lithuania at the international level.

Malin was released by Ross County in December 2012. On 18 June 2013, Malin signed for Highland Football League Club, Brora Rangers FC, on a two-year deal. In October 2021, Malin kept his 150th clean sheet for Brora Rangers in his 289th appearance for the club.

Honours
Ross County
Scottish Challenge Cup: 2006–07, 2010–11

References

External links

1988 births
Living people
Footballers from Bellshill
Association football goalkeepers
Scottish footballers
Ross County F.C. players
Elgin City F.C. players
Brora Rangers F.C. players
Scottish Football League players
Scottish people of Lithuanian descent
Celtic F.C. players